Anjali is an Indian Sandalwood movie and television actress who appears in Kannada cinema. Her original name was Shantha, before director Kashinath named her as Anjali.

Family 
Anjali is married to Sudhakar and since 1998 has settled in Dubai. She has two daughters.

Career 
Anjali has acted in more than 87 films. Some of her notable films are Anantana Avantara, Neenu Nakkare Haalu Sakkare, Tharle Nan Maga, Appa Nanjappa Maga Gunajappa, Ksheera Saagara, Kalavida,  Kona Eedaithe, Undu Hodha Kondu Hodha and Utkarsha. She has acted opposite Vishnuvardhan, Ambareesh, Anant Nag, Jaggesh, Kumar Govind, Kumar Bangarappa, Sridhar, Sunil, Jai Jagadish and Ravikiran. She has also acted in television series with over 500 episodes.

Filmography

References

External links
 Anjali, very popular heroine of films is all set to restart her innings again in a emotional role on Udaya TV Serial Nethravathi
 New soap opera Netharavathi goes on air from Monday
 Anjali Brother Tragic Death
 90ರ ದಶಕದ ಮಾದಕ ನಟಿ ಅಂಜಲಿ ಈಗ ಹೇಗಿದ್ದಾರೆ?ಏನ್ಮಾಡ್ತಿದ್ದಾರೆ?|Actress Anjali Sudhakar | NewsFirst Kannada
 Emotional Life Story | Anjali Sudhakar | Rekhadas | PART - 3
 Rekhadas Interview With Anjali Sudhakar - Part 02 | Rekhadas Talkies
 Kabul Channa Vade | Heroine Anjali | Rekhadas | RD Kitchen | Indian Food
 ದರ್ಶನ್ ಜೊತೆ ನಟಿಸೋಕೆ ನಾನ್ ರೆಡಿ - ಅಂಜಲಿ |Anjali |D Boss |Challenging Star Darshan
 Kannada Actress Anjali Promo | RD Kitchen | Anjali | Rekhadas | Heroine
 Anjali Expresses Desire Of Acting With All The Current Superstars Of Sandalwood | Part 3
 Exclusive: Yesteryear Actress Anjali Appears Before TV After 21 Years..! | Part 1
 ಕಾಶೀನಾಥ್ ನಿಧನರಾದಾಗ ಬರಲಿಲ್ಲವೇಕೆ ಅಂಜಲಿ..? Exclusive Interview Of Actress Anjali | Part 2
 ಅವರಿಲ್ಲದ ಜೀವನ ನನಗೆ ಬೇಡವೆನಿಸಿದೆ - ಅಂಜಲಿ |Nanna Kathe |Karnaataka.in | Tarle NAn Maga Anjali|
 ಹೋಮ್ ಟೂರ್ ವಿತ್ ನಟಿ ಅಂಜಲಿ | Actress Anjali Home Tour | Mane Mane Meenakshi | NewsFirst Kannada
 Anjali Is A Renowned Kannada Actress Who Has Appeared In More Than 97 Films

Living people
Indian film actresses
Actresses in Kannada cinema
Actresses from Bangalore
20th-century Indian actresses
21st-century Indian actresses
People from Ramanagara district
Actresses in Kannada television
Year of birth missing (living people)